Saffa is a Palestinian town in the Ramallah and al-Bireh Governorate, located  west of Ramallah in the northern West Bank. According to the Palestinian Central Bureau of Statistics (PCBS), the town had a population of approximately 3,802 inhabitants in 2007.

Location
It is bordered by Beit 'Ur at Tahta, Kafr Ni'ma and Deir Ibzi to the east, Bil'in, Ni'lin and Al Midya to the north, Israel to the west, and Beit 'Ur at Tahta and Beit Sira to the south.

History
It has been proposed identifying Saffa with Casale Saphet of the Crusader era.

Ottoman era

In 1838 it was noted as a Muslim  village, located in the Beni Harith district, west of Jerusalem. 

In 1870, Victor Guérin noted that: "This village occupies a high plateau; it contains four hundred inhabitants. Some stones, scattered or embedded in Arab buildings, and numerous excavations in the rock, such as  cisterns, tombs, quarries and subterranean vaults, proves that the present Saffa succeeded  an ancient locality." An Ottoman village list of about the same year showed that Saffa had 200 inhabitants with 67 houses,  though the population count included only the men.   

In 1883 the PEF's Survey of Western Palestine described Suffa: "A small village standing high on a ridge, with a well to the east and a sacred place to the south."

In 1896 the population of Safa was estimated to be about 564 persons.

British Mandate era
In the 1922 census of Palestine,  conducted by the British Mandate authorities, Saffa  had a population of 495 Muslims, increasing in the 1931 census  to 644 Muslims, in 143 houses.

In  the  1945 statistics the population was 790 Muslims,  while the total land area was 9,602  dunams, according to an official land and population survey. Of  this,  2,536 were used   for plantations and irrigable land, 2,975  for cereals, while 99 dunams were classified as built-up areas.

Jordanian era
In the wake of the 1948 Arab–Israeli War, and after the 1949 Armistice Agreements, Saffa came under Jordanian rule. It was annexed by Jordan in 1950.

In 1961, the population of Saffa was  1,364.

1967-present
After the Six-Day War in 1967,  Saffa  has been under Israeli occupation. 

After the 1995 accords, 12.9% of  village land was classified as Area B, and the remaining 87.1% as Area C.

Israel has confiscated land from Saffa  in order to construct six Israeli settlements: 

 814 dunams for Kfar Rut,
 781 dunams for Shilat,
 682 dunams for Menora,
 471 dunams for Makkabim,
 441 dunams for Lapid, and
 5 dunams for Hashmona'im.

References

Bibliography

  
 

  
 (p. 109? )

External links
Welcome To Saffa
Saffa, Welcome to Palestine
Survey of Western Palestine, Map 17:  IAA, Wikimedia commons 
Saffa village (fact sheet),  Applied Research Institute–Jerusalem (ARIJ)
Saffa village profile,  ARIJ
Saffa aerial photo,  ARIJ 
Locality Development Priorities and Needs in Saffa Village,  ARIJ 

Villages in the West Bank
Ramallah and al-Bireh Governorate
Municipalities of the State of Palestine